The 1988 Chicago Cubs season was the 117th season of the Chicago Cubs franchise, the 113th in the National League and the 73rd at Wrigley Field. The Cubs finished fourth in the National League East with a record of 77–85, 24 games behind the New York Mets.

The first game under lights at Wrigley Field was on August 8 (8/8/88), against the Philadelphia Phillies.  With the Cubs leading 3–1, in the middle of the 4th inning, a powerful thunderstorm rolled in.  The game was suspended, and finally called at 10:25PM.  
Since the rules of Major League Baseball state that a game is not official unless 5 innings are completed, the first official night game in the history of Wrigley Field was played on August 9, when the Cubs defeated the New York Mets 6 to 4.

Offseason

 October 23, 1987: Dickie Noles was returned to the Chicago Cubs by the Detroit Tigers as part of earlier loan.
 December 8, 1987: Lee Smith was traded by the Chicago Cubs to the Boston Red Sox for Al Nipper and Calvin Schiraldi.
 December 14, 1987: Vance Law was signed as a free agent with the Chicago Cubs.
 February 12, 1988: Goose Gossage was traded by the San Diego Padres with Ray Hayward to the Chicago Cubs for Keith Moreland and Mike Brumley.
 March 31, 1988: Mike Bielecki was traded by the Pittsburgh Pirates to the Chicago Cubs for Mike Curtis (minors).

Regular season

President of the United States Ronald Reagan threw out the ceremonial first pitch on Opening Day at Wrigley Field.

After 5,687 consecutive day games played by the Cubs at Wrigley, the lights were finally lit on August 8, 1988, when 91-year-old fan Harry Grossman gave a countdown and pressed a button, for a game with the Philadelphia Phillies. The game began before an announced crowd of 39,008. The Cubs were leading 3 to 1 and coming to bat in the bottom of the fourth when the rain delay began. The umpires called the game after waiting two hours, ten minutes. The Cubs played the first official night game the following night against the Mets and won, 6–4.

Season standings

Record vs. opponents

Notable transactions
 July 15, 1988: Jim Sundberg was released by the Chicago Cubs.

Roster

Player stats

Batting

Starters by position
Note: Pos = Position; G = Games played; AB = At bats; H = Hits; Avg. = Batting average; HR = Home runs; RBI = Runs batted in

Other batters
Note: G = Games played; AB = At bats; H = Hits; Avg. = Batting average; HR = Home runs; RBI = Runs batted in

Pitching

Starting pitchers
Note: G = Games pitched; IP = Innings pitched; W = Wins; L = Losses; ERA = Earned run average; SO = Strikeouts

Other pitchers
Note: G = Games pitched; IP = Innings pitched; W = Wins; L = Losses; ERA = Earned run average; SO = Strikeouts

Relief pitchers
Note: G = Games pitched; W = Wins; L = Losses; SV = Saves; ERA = Earned run average; SO = Strikeouts

Farm system

Notes

References
1988 Chicago Cubs season at Baseball Reference

Chicago Cubs seasons
Chicago Cubs season
Chicago